Michail Illyich Usanovich (1894—1981) was a Russian/Soviet physical chemist, and an academician of the Academy of Sciences of Kazakh SSR since 1962. He is famous for his generalized acid-base theory.

Michail Usanovich was born to a Jewish doctor's family in Zhytomyr.

After having graduated from Kiev University of Sciences in 1917, he worked in the chemical laboratory of the Academy of Sciences of Ukrainian SSR led by Vladimir Vernadsky up to 1920. He was an employee and the technologist of the Kiev Polytechnical Institute. He became a professor in three universities: Tomsk University in 1930, Central Asian in 1935, and Kazakh in 1944, where he held an academic chair.

Main scientific works
Mikhail Usanovich developed a number of theories and proved a number of facts, such as:
Quantitative solution theory;
Equations of non-colligative properties of solutions and their dependence on composition;
Generalized theory of acids and bases;
The so-called anomalous electrical conductivity Is a rule rather than an exception;
The law of dilution is wrong for most solutions;
Systems where chemical interactions occur at equilibrium concentrations.

Bibliography 
 Theory of acids and bases. Alma-Ata, 1953
 Research in the field of solutions and theory of acids and bases. Alma-Ata, 1970

External links
 

Russian physical chemists
Soviet physical chemists
1894 births
1981 deaths
Taras Shevchenko National University of Kyiv alumni
Academic staff of Tomsk State University